The 1980 New Hampshire gubernatorial election took place on November 4, 1980.

Incumbent Democratic Governor Hugh Gallen was re-elected to a second term in office, once again defeating former Governor Meldrim Thomson Jr., who defeated Lou D'Allesandro for the Republican nomination.

Election results

References

New Hampshire
1980
Gubernatorial